Jenna McCormick (born 7 September 1994) is a professional Australian sportswoman who plays soccer for Danish Elitedivisionen club AGF Fodbold and has played Australian rules football for the Adelaide Football Club in the AFL Women's (AFLW) competition.

Early life 
McCormick was born and raised in Mount Gambier, South Australia, before moving to Adelaide in 2011. She played junior soccer for Blue Lake SC in Mount Gambier. In Mount Gambier, Jenna attended Tenison Woods College and in Adelaide, McCormick attended Walford Anglican School for Girls and played soccer, cricket and Australian rules football at high levels.

Football career 

McCormick made her debut in the W-League for Adelaide United in December 2012 in a loss to Melbourne Victory. She usually plays as a midfielder, but was used as a defender by Adelaide in the 2013–14 W-League. McCormick was included in an Australian Schoolgirls team to tour South America in 2013, and was named player of the tournament.

McCormick joined Canberra United Football Club in 2015. In 2016, she moved to Iceland to play for Stjarnan in the Úrvalsdeild; making her debut as a substitute in a win over Selfoss. Jenna returned to Canberra United for the 2016–17 season.

In July 2017, McCormick signed to play the second half of the 2017 season with Medkila IL in the Toppserien, the top tier of women's soccer in Norway.

In September 2017, McCormick committed to return to Adelaide United for the 2017–18 W-League season.

In October 2018, McCormick signed to play for Brisbane Roar for the 2018–19 W-League season.

In October 2019, McCormick quit AFLW and joined Melbourne Victory FC on a one-year deal.
In November 2019, McCormick made her debut for the National team - the Matilda's. She was in the starting XI in a Friendly against Chile. The Matilda's won the match 2–1.

In July 2020, McCormick inked a deal with Spanish club Real Betis based in Seville on a two-year deal. Only five months later, it was announced that Real Betis and McCormick mutually agreed to terminate her contract, having played only game.

A week after being released by Real Betis, McCormick signed with Melbourne City.

In August 2021, McCormick joined Danish club AGF Fodbold. Playing 25 games overall, 20 in the Danish Women's League and 5 in the Danish Women's Cup.

September 2022 saw McCormick rejoin Adelaide United for the 2022/2023 A-League season. This club is where her professional career began.

Australian rules career
In April 2016, McCormick declared her interest in playing in the newly formed AFL Women's competition, the first professional women's Australian rules football league. She was drafted by Adelaide in the 2016 AFL Women's draft. McCormick missed round 1 of the 2017 season to play for Canberra United in the W-League semi-final on 5 February 2017.

Adelaide signed McCormick for the 2018 season during the trade period in May 2017, and she again missed the opening round of the season due to W-League commitments, joining the team for their round 2 match against . She signed with the Crows for the 2019 season in May 2018.

AFL Women's statistics
 Statistics are correct to the end of the 2019 season

|- style="background-color: #EAEAEA"
! style="background-color: #F0E68C"|2017#
|rowspan=1|
| 5 || 7 || 4 || 2 || 29 || 14 || 43 || 6 || 13 || 0.6 || 0.3 || 4.1 || 2.0 || 6.1 || 0.9 || 1.9
|-
! scope="row" style="text-align:center" | 2018
|rowspan=1|
| 5 || 6 || 5 || 7 || 31 || 6 || 37 || 10 || 15 || 0.8 || 1.2 || 5.2 || 1.0 || 6.2 || 1.7 || 2.5
|- style="background-color: #EAEAEA"
! style="background-color: #F0E68C"|2019#
|rowspan=1|
| 5 || 7 || 0 || 1 || 48 || 16 || 64 || 13 || 13 || 0.0 || 0.1 || 6.9 || 2.3 || 9.1 || 1.9 || 1.9
|- class="sortbottom"
! colspan=3| Career
! 20
! 9
! 10
! 108
! 36
! 144
! 29
! 41
! 0.5
! 0.5
! 5.4
! 1.8
! 7.7
! 1.5
! 2.1
|}

Honours

Soccer

Club
Stjarnan
 Úrvalsdeild: 2016
Canberra United
 W-League Premiership: 2016–17

Individual
 Adelaide United Player of the Year: 2013–14

Australian rules football

Club
Adelaide
 AFL Women's: 2017, 2019
 Key to the City of Adelaide: 28 April 2017 to the Inaugural Premiership Team

See also

List of players who have converted from one football code to another

References

External links

 Profile at Stjarnan 
 

1994 births
Living people
Australian women's soccer players
Australian expatriate women's soccer players
Australian expatriate sportspeople in Iceland
Expatriate women's footballers in Iceland
Adelaide United FC (A-League Women) players
Brisbane Roar FC (A-League Women) players
Melbourne Victory FC (A-League Women) players
Canberra United FC players
Real Betis Féminas players
Melbourne City FC (A-League Women) players
A-League Women players
Women's association football defenders
Women's association football midfielders
People from Mount Gambier, South Australia
Adelaide Football Club (AFLW) players
Australian rules footballers from South Australia
Footballers who switched code
Australian expatriate sportspeople in Norway
Expatriate women's footballers in Norway
Jenna McCormick
Jenna McCormick
Medkila IL (women) players
Australian expatriate sportspeople in Spain
Australian expatriate sportspeople in Denmark
AGF Fodbold (women) players